List of fellows of the Royal Society elected in 1973.

Fellows

Percival Allen
Brigitte Alice Askonas
Francis Thomas Bacon
Alan Baker
Neil Bartlett
 Sir William John Granville Beynon
John Gatenby Bolton
 Sir David Roxbee Cox
Leslie Crombie
Harry Elliot
Douglas Scott Falconer
Geoffrey Alan Gilbert
Harish-Chandra
Sir Richard John Harrison
Harold Horace Hopkins
Anthony Kelly
Egon Hynek Kodicek
Jack Lewis, Baron Lewis of Newnham
Mary Frances Lyon
Peter Bryan Conrad Matthews
George Francis Mitchell
Hélio Gelli Pereira
Paul Emanuel Polani
John G. Ramsay
Lionel Edward Aston Rowson
Monkombu Sambasivan Swaminathan
Jamshed Rustom Tata
David Warren Turner
William Frank Vinen
Paul Egerton Weatherley
Ronald Whittam
Alec David Young

Foreign members

John Bardeen
Manfred Eigen
Ulf Svante von Euler
Francois Jacob

Statute 12 Fellow 
Quintin Hogg, Baron Hailsham of St Marylebone

References

1973
1973 in science
1973 in the United Kingdom